Mees's white-eye (Heleia javanica), also known as the Javan grey-throated white-eye or grey-throated ibon, is a species of bird in the family Zosteropidae. It is endemic to Java and Bali.

References

Mees's white-eye
Birds of Bali
Birds of Java
Mees's white-eye
Taxonomy articles created by Polbot